The men's -100 kg Judo competitions at the 2014 Commonwealth Games in Glasgow, Scotland was held on 26 July at the Scottish Exhibition and Conference Centre. Judo will return to the program, after last being competed back in 2002.

Results

Final

Repechages

Preliminaries

References

M100
2014